This is a list of awards and nominations received by The Black Eyed Peas, an American hip hop group from Los Angeles, California.

ALMA Awards

|-
|2009
|Black Eyed Peas 
|Best of the Year in Music
|
|}

American Music Awards 
The American Music Awards is an annual American music awards show celebrating worlwile artist, based on commercial performance, such as sales and airplay, in the United States.
|-
|2003
|rowspan=5|Black Eyed Peas
|Favorite Rap/Hip-Hop Band/Duo/Group
|
|-
|rowspan=2|2005
|Favorite Pop/Rock Band/Duo/Group
|
|-
|Favorite Rap/Hip-Hop Band/Duo/Group
|
|-
|rowspan=3|2006
|Favorite Rap/Hip-Hop Band/Duo/Group
|
|-
|Favourite Soul/R&B Band/Duo/Group
|
|-
|Monkey Business
|Favorite Rap/Hip-Hop Album
|
|-
|rowspan=3|2009
|The E.N.D
|Favorite Soul/R&B Album
|
|-
|rowspan=3|"Black Eyed Peas"
|Favorite Soul/R&B Band/Duo/Group
|
|-
|Favorite Pop/Rock Band/Duo/Group
|
|-
|2010
|Favorite Pop/Rock Band/Duo/Group
|
|}

ASCAP Pop Music Awards

|-
|2012
|"Just Can't Get Enough"
|Most Performed Song
|
|-
|}

ARIA Music Awards
The ARIA Music Awards is an annual series of awards celebrating the Australian music industry, put on by the Australian Recording Industry Association (ARIA).
|-
|2010
|Black Eyed Peas
|Most Popular International Artist
|
|-
|}

BET Awards
The BET Awards is an American award show that was established in 2001 by the Black Entertainment Television network to celebrate African Americans and other American minorities in music, acting, sports, and other fields of entertainment over the past year. The group received one award from two nominations.
|-
|2006
|rowspan=2|Black Eyed Peas
|Best Group
|
|-
|2010
|Best Group
|
|}

Billboard Music Awards 
The Billboard Music Awards are honors given out annually by Billboard, a publication and music popularity chart covering the music business.
|-
|2003
|"Where is the Love?"
|Mainstream Top 40 Track of the Year 
|
|-
|rowspan=2|2004
|"Let's Get It Started"
|Top Digital Track
|
|-
|rowspan=5|Black Eyed Peas 
|Top Digital Artist
|
|-
|2005
|Top Duo or Group
|
|-
|rowspan=4|2011
|Top Band/Duo/Group
|
|-
|Top Dance Artist
|
|-
|Top Pop Artist
|
|-
|The E.N.D
|Top Pop Album
|
|-
|rowspan="1"|2012
|Black Eyed Peas
|Top Duo/Group
|
|-
|rowspan="1"|2020
|"Ritmo (Bad Boys For Life)"
|Top Dance/Electronic Song
|
|-
|}

Billboard Latin Music Awards 

|-
|2009
|rowspan ="3" |Black Eyed Peas
|rowspan ="2" |Crossover Artist of the Year
|
|-
|rowspan ="8" |2021
|
|-
|Duo/Group Top Latin Albums Artist of the Year
|
|-
|rowspan ="4" |"Ritmo (Bad Boys For Life)" (with J Balvin)
| Vocal Event Hot Latin Song of the Year
|
|-
|Hot Latin Song of the Year
|
|-
|Latin Rhythm Song of the Year
|
|-
|rowspan ="2" |Sales Song of the Year
|
|-
|rowspan ="2" |"Mamacita" (with Ozuna)
|
|-
|Latin Pop Song of the Year
|
|-
|}

Billboard R&B/Hip-Hop Awards 

|-
|rowspan=2|2004
|Latin Girls
|Top R&B/Hip-Hop Song
|
|-
|Elephunk
|Top Rap Album
|
|}

BMI Pop Awards

|-
|2012
|"Just Can't Get Enough"
|Award-winning Songs
|
|-
|}

BRIT Awards

|-
|rowspan=2|2004
|rowspan=3|Black Eyed Peas
|Best Pop Act
|
|-
|International Group
|
|-
|2006
|International Group
|
|-
|2010
|The E.N.D
|International Album
|
|-
|2011
|Black Eyed Peas
|International Group
|
|-
|}

Channel [V] Thailand Music Video Awards

|-
|2006
|rowspan=2|Black Eyed Peas
|Popular International Group
|
|-
|2011
|Popular International Group
|
|}

ECHO Awards, Germany

|-
|2006
|rowspan=2|Black Eyed Peas
|Best International Pop/Rock Group
|
|-
|2010
|Best International Pop/Rock Group
|
|}

Grammy Awards
The Grammy Award is an award presented by the Recording Academy to recognize achievements in the music industry. The Black Eyed Peas received 6 awards from 15 nominations.

|-
|rowspan=2|2004
|rowspan=2|"Where Is the Love?"  (ft. Justin Timberlake)
|Best Rap/Sung Collaboration
|
|-
|rowspan=2|Record of the Year
|
|-
|rowspan=4|2005
|rowspan=3|"Let's Get It Started"
|
|-
|Best Rap Performance by a Duo or Group
|
|-
|rowspan=2|Best Rap Song
|
|-
|"Hey Mama"
|
|-
|rowspan=4|2006
|rowspan=2|"Don't Phunk with My Heart"
|Best Rap Performance by a Duo or Group
|
|-
|Best Rap Song
|
|-
|"Gone Going"  (with Jack Johnson)
|Best Pop Collaboration with Vocals
|
|-
|"Don't Lie"
|rowspan=2|Best Pop Performance by a Duo or Group with Vocals
|
|-
|rowspan=2|2007
|"My Humps"
|
|-
|"Mas Que Nada"
|Best Urban/Alternative Performance
|
|-
|rowspan=6|2010
|rowspan=2|The E.N.D.
|Album of the Year
|
|-
|Best Pop Vocal Album
|
|-
|rowspan=2|"I Gotta Feeling"
|Record of the Year
|
|-
|Best Pop Performance by a Duo or Group with Vocals
|
|-
|rowspan=2|"Boom Boom Pow"
|Best Dance Recording
|
|-
|Best Short Form Music Video
|
|-
|}

IFPI Hong Kong Top Sales Music Awards
 
|-
| 2005
| Monkey Business
| Top 10 Best Selling Foreign Albums
| 
|-

Juno Awards 

|-
|2006
|"Monkey Business"
|International Album Of The Year
|
|-
|2010
|The E.N.D
|International Album Of The Year
|
|}

Latin American Music Awards 

|-
|rowspan=5|2021
|Black Eyed Peas
|Favorite Crossover Artist
|
|-
|rowspan=3|"Ritmo (Bad Boys for Life)"
|Song of The Year
|
|-
|Favorite Urban Song
|
|-
|Collaboration of the Year
|
|-
|"Mamacita"
|Favorite Pop Song
|
|}

Los 40 Music Awards

Mnet Asian Music Awards

|-
|2005
|Black Eyed Peas - "Don't Lie"
|Best International Artist
|
|}

Mobo Awards

|-
|2006
|rowspan=2|Black Eyed Peas
|Best Group
|
|-
|2010
|Best International Act
|
|}

MTV Asia Awards

|-
|2006
|Black Eyed Peas
|Favorite Pop Act
|
|}

MTV Australia Music Video Awards
  
|- 
|rowspan=2|2005 
|rowspan=2|"Hey Mama" 
|Best R&B Video
|
|- 
|Sexiest Video
|
|- 
|2006
|"Don't Phunk with my Heart"
|Best Hip-Hop Video
|
|}

MTV Europe Music Award

|-
|rowspan=3|2004
|Elephunk
|Best Album
|
|-
|rowspan=6|Black Eyed Peas
|Best Group
|
|-
|Best Pop Act
|
|-
|rowspan=2|2005
|Best Pop Act
|
|-
|Best Group
|
|-
|2006
|Best Group
|
|-
|rowspan=2|2009
|Best Group
|
|-
|"I Gotta Feeling"
|Best Song
|
|}

MTV Russia Music Award

|-
|rowspan=1|2005
|rowspan=2|The Black Eyed Peas 
|rowspan=2|Best International Act
|
|-
|rowspan=1|2006
|
|}

MTV Video Music Awards

|-
|1999
|"Joints and Jam"
|Best Special Effects in a Video
|
|-
|2001
|"Request + Line"  (ft. Macy Gray)
|Best Hip-Hop Video
|
|-
|rowspan=3|2004
|rowspan=3|"Hey Mama"
|Best Hip-Hop Video
|
|-
|Best Dance Video
|
|-
|Best Choreography in a Video
|
|-
|2005
|"Dont Phunk with my Heart"
|Best Group Video
|
|-
|rowspan=2|2006
|rowspan=2|"My Humps"
|Best Hip-Hop Video
|
|-
|Ringtone of the Year
|
|-
|rowspan=2|2020
|"Ritmo (Bad Boys for Life)"
|Best Collaboration
|
|-
|"[[Mamacita (Black Eyed Peas, Ozuna and J. Rey Soul song)|Mamacita]]"
|rowspan=2|Best Latin
|
|-
|rowspan=1|2021
|"Girl Like Me"
|
|}

MTV Music Video Awards Japan 

|-
|2004
|"Where is the Love?"
|Best Group Video
|
|-
|2005
|"Let's Get It Started"
|Best Hip-Hop Video
|
|-
|rowspan=3|2006
|rowspan=2|"Don't Phunk with my Heart"
|Best Group Video
|
|-
|Best Pop Video
|
|-
|The E.N.D
|Album of the Year
|
|-
|rowspan="2"|2010
|rowspan="1"|"I Gotta Feeling"
|Best Karaokee! Song
|
|-
|"My Humps"
|Best Group Video
|
|-
|2011
|"The Time (Dirty Bit)"
|Best Group Video
|
|-
|}

MuchMusic Video Awards

|-
|rowspan=2|2005
|rowspan=2|"Let's Get It Started"
|Favorite International Group
|
|-
|Best International Video - Group
|
|-
|rowspan=2|"2006
|rowspan=2|"My Humps"
|Best International Group
|
|-
|People's Choice: Favorite International Artist
|
|-
|2009
|"Boom Boom Pow"
|International Video of the Year - Group
|
|-
|2010
|"I Gotta Feeling"
|International Video of the Year - Group
|
|}

MYX Music Awards

|-
|2006
|"My Humps"
|Favorite International Music Video
|
|}

NAACP Awards

|-
|2006
|rowspan=2|Black Eyed Peas
|Outstanding Duo or Group
|
|-
|rowspan=2|2010
|Outstanding Group/Duo or Collaboration
|
|-
|"Boom Boom Pow"
|Outstanding Music Video
|
|-
|2011
|Black Eyed Peas
|Outstanding Group/Duo or Collaboration
|
|-
|}

Nickelodeon Kids' Choice Awards 

|-
|2004
|"Where is the Love" (featuring Justin Timberlake)
|Favorite Song
|
|-
|2005
|rowspan=4|The Black Eyed Peas
|rowspan=4|Favorite Music Group
|
|-
|2006
|
|-
|2007
|
|-
|rowspan=2|2010
|
|-
|"I Gotta Feeling"
|Favorite Song
|
|-
|2011
|rowspan=3|The Black Eyed Peas
|rowspan=3|Favorite Music Group
|
|-
|2012
|
|-
|2021
|
|}

NRJ Music Awards

|-
|rowspan=2|2006
|"Monkey Business"
|International Album Of The Year
|
|-
|rowspan=3|Black Eyed Peas
|International Group Of The Year
|
|-
|2007
|International Group Of The Year
|
|-
|rowspan=3|2010
|International Group Of The Year
|
|-
|The E.N.D
|International Album Of The Year
|
|-
|"I Gotta Feeling"
|International Song Of The Year
|
|-
|rowspan=2|2011
|rowspan=3|Black Eyed Peas
|International Group Of The Year
|
|-
|Concert Of The Year
|
|-
|2012
|International Group Of The Year
|
|-
|2021
|"Girl Like Me" (feat. Shakira)
|International Collaboration Of The Year
|
|-
|}

NRJ Radio Awards

|-
|2004
|"Where is the Love?"
|Best International Song
|
|-
|}

People's Choice Award ,USA

|-
|2006
|rowspan=3|Black Eyed Peas
|Favorite Group
|
|-
|2007
|Favorite Group
|
|-
|2010
|Favorite Pop Act
|
|}

Premios Juventud
The Premios Juventud  is an awards show for Spanish-speaking celebrities in the areas of film, music, sports, fashion, and pop culture, presented by the television network Univision. Winners are determined by Univision public.

|-
| 2020 
| "Ritmo (Bad Boys For Life)"
| Can't Get Enough Of This Song
| 
|-}

Premios 40 Principales
The Premios 40 Principales is an annual Spanish awards show that recognises the people and works of pop musicians.

|-
|style="text-align:center" rowspan="2" | 2009 || The Black Eyed Peas || Best International Artist || 
|-
| I Gotta Feeling || Best International Song ||

Premios Lo Nuestro
Premio Lo Nuestro is a Spanish-language awards show honoring the best of Latin music, presented by Univision, a Spanish-language television network based in the United States. The awards began in 1989.

|-
| rowspan="4" style="text-align:center" | 2021
| rowspan="3"| "Ritmo (Bad Boys for Life)" (ft. J Balvin)
| Urban Song of the Year
| 
|-
| Urban Collaboration of the Year
| 
|-
| rowspan="2"| Crossover Collaboration of the Year
| 
|-
| "Mamacita" (ft. Ozuna & J. Rey Soul)
| 
|}

Premios Nuestra Tierra 
These awards are a recognition that is made to Colombian artists and some international artists. They have a format similar to that of the Grammy Awards, but restricted to the Colombian scope. The group received one award from two nominations.

|-
| rowspan="2"| 2020
| rowspan="2"| "Ritmo (Bad Boys for Life)" (ft. J Balvin)
| Public Choice Song
| 
|-
| rowspan="2"| Best Dance/EDM Song
| 
|-
| rowspan="3"| 2021
| rowspan="3"| "Girl Like Me (ft. Shakira)
| 
|-
| Best Video
| 
|-
| Public Choice Song
| 
|}

Radio Music Awards 

|-
|2005
|Black Eyed Peas
|Artist of the Year/Mainstream Hit Radio
|
|}

Rock (The Vote) Awards

|-
|2005
|Black Eyed Peas
|Patrick Lippert Award
|
|}

Soul Train Music Awards

|-
|rowspan=2|2006
|Monkey Business
|Best Soul/R&B Album By Band/Duo/Group
|
|-
|"My Humps"
|Best Soul/R&B or Rap Dance Cut
|
|}

Teen Choice Awards 

|-
|2004
|"Where is the Love?"
|Rap/Hip-Hop Track
|
|-
|2005
|"Monkey Business"
|Rap Album
|
|-
|2006
|Black Eyed Peas
|Rap Artist
|
|-
|rowspan=2|2009
|"Boom Boom Pow"
|Rap/Hip-Hop track
|
|-
|The E.N.D
|Group Album
|
|-
|2010
|Black Eyed Peas
|Best Group
|
|-
|rowspan=3|2011
|Black Eyed Peas
|Choice Music:Group
|
|-
|"Just Cant Get Enough"
|Hip-Hop Track
|
|-
|"The Time (Dirty Bit)"
|Single
|
|}

TMF Awards (Netherland)

|-
|2006
|Black Eyed Peas
|Best Act International
|
|}

Vibe Awards 

|-
|2005
|Black Eyed Peas
|Best Group
|
|}

World Music Awards 

|-
|2005
|rowspan=4|Black Eyed Peas
|Best Selling Pop Group
|
|-
|rowspan=5|2010
|Best Selling Pop Act
|
|-
|Best Selling R&B Act
|
|-
|Best Selling Hip/Hop Act
|
|-
|The E.N.D
|Best Selling Album
|
|-
|"I Gotta Feeling"
|Best Selling Single
|
|-
|}

References

Awards
Lists of awards received by American musician
Lists of awards received by musical group